Václav Daněk (born 22 December 1960 in Ostrava) is a retired Czech football player. He played 22 matches for Czechoslovakia and scored 9 goals. In total, he scored 197 league goals in 402 games (200/99 Ostrava, 41/12 Dukla, 144/83 Innsbruck, 17/3 Le Havre).

In his country he played for Baník Ostrava and witnessed the golden era in the club's history, contributing to two Czechoslovak First League championships. His strong temper contributed towards him not being picked for the Czechoslovakia squad that reached the quarter-finals of the 1990 FIFA World Cup, when he was at the peak of his career in Austria, playing for FC Tirol Innsbruck because of discrepancies with coach Jozef Vengloš who preferred players like Tomáš Skuhravý, Ivo Knoflíček and Stanislav Griga.

Despite all these, he was selected Best Player in the Austrian league and finished top scorer three years in a row which allowed him to finish third in 1991's European Golden Boot contest sponsored by the French football magazine "France Football".

After the World Cup in Italy, where the Czechoslovakian team performed very well, Vengloš was replaced by Milan Máčala who gave Daněk his full confidence, making him the team's new standard bearer and first pick-up choice for the attack.

Maybe his best achievement with Czechoslovakia took place during the UEFA Euro 1992 qualifying match against Spain in 1991. A few days prior to this crucial match Daněk's baby son was badly injured in an accident and had to be hospitalized, which made Daněk declare himself unavailable for the match.

The following days, all other three Czech strikers were injured during training or in their league matches, which left Macala completely forward-less. The coach decided to call Daněk just hours before the match, and he received a "YES" from the forward.

Without any previous training and/or tactical coaching advice, Daněk played the game. With Spain leading 2–1, he scored twice in the second half against Andoni Zubizarreta and was the Man of the Match of an amazing comeback and victory of his nation.

When asked why he did finally play the game, despite his son being in hospital, he declared "My country and my coach needed me and here I am".

Daněk's son, Jan Daněk, played football in the Czech First League in the 2000s.

References

External links
 Hall of Fame Dukla Praha profile

1960 births
Living people
Sportspeople from Ostrava
Czech footballers
Czechoslovak footballers
FC Baník Ostrava players
Dukla Prague footballers
Le Havre AC players
FC Wacker Innsbruck players
Ligue 1 players
Austrian Football Bundesliga players
Czechoslovakia international footballers
Czech expatriate footballers
Expatriate footballers in France
Expatriate footballers in Austria
Czech football managers
Expatriate football managers in Slovakia
FK Dukla Banská Bystrica managers
Czechoslovak expatriate footballers
Czechoslovak expatriate sportspeople in France
Czechoslovak expatriate sportspeople in Austria
Czech expatriate sportspeople in Austria
Czech expatriate sportspeople in Slovakia
FK Vítkovice managers
FK Drnovice managers
Association football forwards
FC Tirol Innsbruck players
FC Swarovski Tirol players